Omalur is a state assembly constituency in Salem district of Tamil Nadu, India. Its State Assembly Constituency number is 84. It comprises a portion of Omalur taluk and forms a part of the wider Salem constituency for national elections to the Parliament of India. It is one of the 234 State Legislative Assembly Constituencies in Tamil Nadu, in India. Elections and winners in the constituency are listed below. Elections were not held in 1957 and 1962.

Madras State

Tamil Nadu

Election results

2021

2016

2011

2006

2001

1996

1991

1989

1984

1980

1977

1971

1967

1952

References 

 

Assembly constituencies of Tamil Nadu
Salem district